Holy Cross is an unincorporated community in Marion County, Kentucky, United States. Its post office  is closed. The town developed at the site of the first Roman Catholic church in Kentucky.

References

Unincorporated communities in Marion County, Kentucky
Unincorporated communities in Kentucky